Giorgio Zancanaro (born 15 April 1940 in San Michele, Alessandria) is an Italian former cyclist.

Major results

1961
1st Stage 6 Tour de l'Avenir
2nd Giro dell'Emilia
1963
3rd Overall Giro d'Italia
1st Stage 9 
1964
1st Giro di Toscana
1st Stage 13 Giro d'Italia
1967
1st Stage 1 Giro d'Italia
2nd Tre Valli Varesine

References

1940 births
People from Alessandria
Living people
Italian male cyclists
Cyclists from Piedmont
Sportspeople from the Province of Alessandria